Jakob Steigmiller (born  in Biberach an der Riss) is a German male  track cyclist. He competed in the team pursuit event at the 2011 and 2012 UCI Track Cycling World Championships.

References

External links
 Profile at cyclingarchives.com

1990 births
Living people
People from Biberach an der Riss
Sportspeople from Tübingen (region)
German track cyclists
German male cyclists
Cyclists from Baden-Württemberg